Down (re-titled The Shaft on DVD) is a 2001 science fiction horror film written and directed by Dick Maas and starring James Marshall, Naomi Watts, and Eric Thal. It is a remake of the 1983 Dutch-language film De Lift (The Elevator), which was also directed by Maas.

Watts plays the role of pushy journalist Jennifer Evans, and Marshall is Mark, an elevator repairman and former Marine. The movie was mainly filmed in the Netherlands, although the crew briefly visited New York City and the District of Columbia as well for exterior shots.

The film was funded by Nederlands Fonds, and produced by First Floor Features and AVRO, with post-production by Sapex Scripts. It premiered at the Cannes Film Festival in May 2001, and was released on video in the United States two years later.

Plot
In New York City, a stray bolt of lightning strikes the 102-floor, 73-elevator Millennium Building. The three main express elevators begin acting strangely, resulting in a guard's flashlight being crushed. The next day, a group of pregnant women are held up between floors 21 and 22; The elevator overheats rapidly, causing two women to give birth and hospitalizing the rest. Reporter Jennifer Evans  is called to write a report on the incident. After an investigation by METEOR elevator company technicians Jeff McClellan and Mark Newman, they determine that nothing is wrong with the elevators, a large part being Jeff's inability to actually admit there is something wrong (he states throughout his scenes that the computer controlling the elevators has absolutely no defects).

A short time later, a blind man and his guide dog disappear in the building.  The two guards from the beginning of the film discover the dog's corpse hanging from its collar on a shaft support. The discovering guard's head is caught between the elevator doors. He is decapitated a short while later, his partner too horrified to help him. Once again, the METEOR executives find nothing wrong with the elevators. Evans interviews Newman, who sarcastically states "Nine people out of ten make it out of an elevator alive." Evans places this in her report, causing a large controversy over his statement by his boss, Mitchell, and the police. During the same day, a roller skater is sucked into an elevator in the parking garage and shot from the 86th floor of the building to his death. The roller skater's death is explained to media as suicide.

Evans visits Newman and shows him a tape of the roller skater's death. She points out the time it normally takes for the elevator to go up 87 floors would take about 40 seconds to a minute. However, the elevator ascended the floors in less than two seconds, thus noting that there is definitely something wrong. When they try to show the tape to Jeff, he refuses to watch it and leaves abruptly. Instead, they go to Evans' office and look up a man named Gunther Steinberg, who had been experimenting with organic reproducing computer chips using dolphin brains. However, the project had gone disastrously wrong and Steinberg was fired. Later the next morning Milligan, who remains suspicious of the elevators throughout the film, discovers Jeff's corpse in an elevator shaft. When Jennifer and Mark arrive, they are shocked to hear that the police have concocted a story that has Jeff being a terrorist and being behind the incidents and assure the public that the threat is over. Later during the day, an elevator cab flies to top floor at such a speed that the floor flies off and all the people in it are killed. This event reaches the President and is seen as an act of terrorism.

A terrorism unit is assembled at the building to get any further terrorists out of the building.  Meanwhile, Jennifer and Mark discover a recent suicide could be linked to the incidents, as his extremely superstitious widow believes his soul has returned to punish others. Jennifer and Mark enter the building to discover and stop the threat once and for all.  During the entry, Jennifer is taken into custody posing as a METEOR executive.  During her first attempt to prove this fraud, she receives a phone call from a friend to explains that while Steinberg's time working on the chips has been revoked, Steinberg continued to work on the project except not with dolphin brains. Eventually, Mitchell abandons Steinberg for fear of his own reputation being ruined. Mark manages to get into the Millennium Building and discovers a large bio-chip in the form of a brain in an elevator shaft. It is assumed that this brain is alive and controlling the elevators. He attempts to destroy using a screwdriver, but this attempt fails when it sends a flaming elevator down to kill him. Mark barely escapes while the elevator kills a SWAT officer who was barely out of the elevator shaft before he was sliced in half from his waist down with the upper half of his body sliding across the floor. Mark gets a hold of a stinger missile launcher and is about to destroy the organ when Steinberg intervenes, threatening him. Jennifer appears, having escaped custody and frees Mark. As Mark tries to destroy the organ a third time, the police enter, giving Steinberg the opportunity to hold Jennifer hostage. Jennifer manages to escape thanks to Steinberg being unable to recognize one of his superiors. Steinberg is grabbed by the elevator shaft cables and pulled in, along with Mark. At the last second, Jennifer kicks the stinger launcher to Mark, who proceeds to destroy the organ. Steinberg's mutilated corpse falls seconds later.

Some time later, Mark and Jennifer leave a hospital where they find themselves trapped in an elevator.  However, it proves to be a ruse for Mark to make a romantic overture toward Jennifer.

Cast
 James Marshall as Mark Newman
 Naomi Watts as Jennifer Evans
 Eric Thal as Jeffrey McClellan
 Michael Ironside as Gunter Steinberg
 Edward Herrmann as Matthew Milligan
 Dan Hedaya as Lt. McBain
 Ron Perlman as Adrian Mitchell
 Kathryn Meisle as Mildred
 Martin McDougall as Guard Andy
 John Cariani as Guard Gary
 David Gwillim as Mr. Faith

Production
Following the release of his film De Lift in 1983, Dutch filmmaker Dick Maas intended to direct a remake of the film. Warner Bros. approached Maas regarding a remake for American audiences, but nothing materialized until the mid-1990s when Maas officially began work on the project. Production occurred in New York City while exterior shots were taken in the Netherlands.

Release
Down premiered at the Cannes Film Festival on May 11, 2001. Artisan Entertainment released the film on DVD, retitled as The Shaft, on May 20, 2003. The film was released on blu-ray, under its original title, on October 31, 2017 by Blue Underground. It was initially slated to release on October 10, 2017, but was quietly delayed.

Reception
Rotten Tomatoes reported that 20% of critics have given the film a positive review based on 5 reviews, with an average rating of 4.40/10. Common criticisms include that the film was not gripping enough, had a weak storyline, generally unrealistic deaths, weak dialogue and unconvincing special effects.

The film was not well received in the Netherlands and was seen as comparing poorly to De Lift, considered to be one of the strongest Dutch horror films of all time, while Down was regarded as a bad American B-film.

References

External links
 

2001 films
2001 horror films
American science fiction horror films
English-language Dutch films
Films set in elevators
Films directed by Dick Maas
American remakes of Dutch films
Dutch horror films
Remakes of Dutch films
Horror film remakes
Films set in the United States
Techno-horror films
2000s English-language films
2000s American films